The Pasco County Library Cooperative (PCLC) is the public library system that serves all residents of Pasco County, Florida, and is a member of the Tampa Bay Library Consortium. The Pasco County Library System, as it was originally known, was established by county ordinance in 1980.

In 1999, the Pasco County Public Library Cooperative was established as a result of an Interlocal Agreement between the Pasco County Board of County Commissioners and the Zephyrhills City Council. It consists of seven branch libraries and one cooperative partner library, Zephyrhills Public Library.

The Pasco County Libraries operate on a budget of $6,344,041 for fiscal year 2016. Pasco Libraries circulated 1,195,649 items for fiscal year 2016; up-to-date statistical information can be found on their website at:  The head of library services reports to the Assistant County Administrator for Public Services.

History
The Pasco County Library Cooperative was once known as the Pasco County Library System. It was established on July 22, 1980. There were municipal-owned and operated libraries in three different cities: Dade City, New Port Richey, and Zephyrhills. Three libraries were perated by volunteers in the communities of Hudson, Holiday, and Land O' Lakes, were also incorporated into the system.

In 1986, a $10 million bond referendum was passed by voters to improve the public libraries and build new parks countywide. After this referendum was passed, two facilities were replaced (Hudson and Land O' Lakes) and two facilities were built in un-served areas (Regency Park and South Holiday). The Hugh Embry Library in Dade City was renovated and expanded with an addition. With additional funding from Federal programs, the Centennial Park Library and New River Library were also built. In 2000 the system was organized as a cooperative when the City of Zephyrhills library joined it.

Branches
The Pasco County Public Library Cooperative consists of seven branches and one cooperative partner (Zephyrhills). The administrative offices for the system are located at the Hudson Regional Library.

Centennial Park Branch Library 
The Centennial Park Branch Library was closed for remodeling but reopened in late May 2021. It offers many standard library services including books, audio books, DVDs, and a large meeting space. It provides computers, study rooms, and programs for all ages such as book clubs, reading clubs, gaming, story time, family movies. Patrons also have access to e-content such as databases, eBooks and audio books through Overdrive, Hoopla, Flipster Magazines, and the New York Times. It also provides eGovernment resources as well as computers for job searching.

Hudson Regional Library/Administration and Support Services 
This library has many activities for people, like;  storytime, paws for reading, teen advisory board, and internet safety lessons. Their community outreach has increased a lot over the years. They now advertise their events on Facebook, Youtube, and Twitter.  The Paws for reading is an event where the library brings in animals for the K-5 students to practice reading out loud. This allows school-age children to get comfortable reading out loud without being judged and have their reading skills improve. The internet safety lesson in basics of how to stay safe when handling technology. They cover common scams they may encounter when shopping online, ways your information may be at risk, and what they can do about it. The library also received some money in 2019 and decided to open Studio H. Studio H is a unique multimedia recording studio at Hudson Regional Library, offering the community a free, fully-equipped, adaptable space for audio recording, videography, photography, and interactive technology. This recording studio is free for all musicians to use and has all the equipment they would need. It has a variety of instruments, and with the video capability, you can make your own music video. This library also has a makerspace area. Makerspace is a do-it-yourself center where you can learn, create, design, and build. Makerspaces can be high-tech with children coding and doing other activities or it can be low-tech with just some building blocks. The point of a makerspace is that children can explore their interests and make something.

Hugh Embry Branch Library 

Hugh Embry Library was established in 1904 in Dade City, Florida. Its namesake Hugh Embry (1879–1907), then 25, was convalescing and had exhausted the books he could borrow from friends. He raised $50 to start a library and called it the Shakespeare Club. He chose books and ran the library out of his family home until his death from tuberculosis a few years later.

The Pasco Library Association had been established to manage the library and took ownership. They moved the books to sites around the city until The Women's Club took them in. At the time membership was free for members or relatives of members of the Club; others were charged 10 cents. The Women's Club began lending the books to the grammar school and throughout the County for children to read. In 1927, the Women's Club began loaning books to the general population for free; the library was moved to a free room in the Herbert Massey building. To raised money to furnish the library, The Women's Club sold food to the workers of Dade City. Within a month of its opening, the library had attracted 440 registered borrowers, and it was open three afternoons a week. By 1930 the project had grown too large for the Women's club to handle. The Library was incorporated August 24, 1930 and operated this way for twenty-four years. The mayor, Fred Touchton, gave the library $10 a month to purchase classical books for children. However, the funds donated by the city only amounted to $37.50, enough to pay a librarian monthly. There was no money for books or supplies, so the Women's Club jumped in to raise donations and save the library again.

In the 1940s the Works Progress Administration under President Franklin D. Roosevelt completed a new City Hall. A room was provided for the Library. The books were thrown into trucks from the window of the second floor of the Massey Building, and transported to the new library. The library continued to grow.

In 1952 the City gave property across the street from City Hall for the library. In 1953, the City assumed the assets of the library. On July 12, 1953 Dade City became financially responsible for Hugh Embry Library. In 1962, the Friends of the Library group raised $12,000 to build a new building for the library. The city donated $25,000 and the "Friends" raised another $12,000. In November 1963 the library moved into its permanent home.

In 1981, Pasco County chartered its own library commission and began operating and maintaining the library under a no-cost lease. In 1988, the City Commission of Dade City sold the library to the county for $150,000. In 1991, the library was expanded by funds raised through a tax approved in 1986.

The Hugh Embry Branch Library offers many standard library services including books, audio books, DVDs, and a large meeting space. It provides computers, study rooms, and programs for all ages such as book clubs, reading clubs, gaming, story time, family movies. Patrons also have access to e-content such as databases, eBooks and audio books through Overdrive, Hoopla, Flipster Magazines, and New York Times. It also provides eGovernment resources as well as computers for job searching.

Land o' Lakes Branch Library 

The Land o' Lakes Branch Library began as a small section of a county building located on U.S. Highway 41 but was later moved to a larger location as a result of its increasing growth. In 1980, it became an official part of the countywide library system, moving into a Land o' Lakes plaza storefront in 1988. A new Land o' Lakes Branch Library was built at the current location with bond money and opened to the public on December 12, 1991. The library underwent an expansion project beginning in 2005, and it was reopened to the public on April 22, 2007.

The Land o' Lakes Branch Library property covers a total area of 18,000 square feet. Following its renovation, the library housed several study rooms, a separate children's room, a teen room, and a computer lab. In 2015, the computer lab was moved next to the collections, and the space that had formerly housed the computer lab became a woodworking-based makerspace, The Foundry, which was opened to the public on December 17, 2015. The focus of The Foundry was decided by a committee that included both patrons of all ages who intended to use the space and library staff.

Beginning from August 14, 2021,the Land o' Lakes Branch Library is currently undergoing further renovations,offering updated technology, and expansion of existing features, such as the lobby and renovations of spaces like the makerspace and areas for all patrons. New landscaping and outdoor areas to be enjoyed as well, with Summer 2022 being the date of reopening.

New River Branch Library 

The New River Branch Library was closed for remodeling, but as of April 30, 2021, has been open to the public, though spaces like the outdoor garden space are still undergoing further renovation. It offers many standard library services including books, audio books, DVDs, and a large meeting space. It also features a community garden. It provides computers, study rooms, and programs for all ages such as book clubs, reading clubs, gaming, story time, family movies. Patrons also have access to e-content such as databases, eBooks and audio books through Overdrive, Hoopla, Flipster Magazines, and New York Times. It also provides eGovernment resources as well as computers for job searching.

Regency Park Branch Library 

The Regency Park Branch Library opened its doors to the public on October 26, 1990 and was expanded in 2007. It offers many standard library services including books, audio books, DVDs, and a large meeting space. It also features a test kitchen makerspace, Regency Fresh, which opened to the public on October 17, 2019. The Regency Park Library provides computers, study rooms, and programs for all ages such as book clubs, reading clubs, gaming, story time, family movies. Patrons also have access to e-content such as databases, eBooks and audio books through Overdrive, Hoopla, Flipster Magazines, and New York Times. It also provides eGovernment resources as well as computers for job searching.

South Holiday Branch Library 
The South Holiday Branch Library offers many standard library services including books, audio books, DVDs, a large meeting space. It also features a sewing makerspace. It provides computers, study rooms, and programs for all ages such as book clubs, reading clubs, gaming, story time, family movies. Patrons also have access to e-content such as databases, eBooks and audio books through Overdrive, Hoopla, Flipster Magazines, and New York Times. It also provides eGovernment resources as well as computers for job searching.

Zephyrhills Public Library (Cooperative Partner) 
The Zephyrhills Public Library is a City of Zephyrhills funded facility, founded in 1912. The library seeks to encourage reading and the use of technology for life-long learning and the enhancement of the community's quality of life. The library provides open and equal access to the resources and services of the library. In 1999, the library, together with the Pasco County Library System, formed the Pasco County Library Cooperative in order to offer residents of Pasco County a broader base of services. The same library card is used at the Zephyrhills Library and the county libraries.

Starkey Ranch Theatre Library Cultural Center 
The new Starkey Ranch Theatre Library Cultural Center is the newest addition to the Pasco Cooperative opened in 2021. Due to it being connected to the Starkey Ranch K-8 school and it remaining open after school hours it is a hybrid school and public library. Housed in the library is a theater where local theatre company The Acting Studio teaches and performs.

Makerspaces

The Foundry
The Foundry at the Land O' Lakes Branch Library is the first dedicated makerspace in Pasco Libraries. It was officially opened on December 17, 2015. The Foundry is equipped with two 3-D printers, as well as computer-aided-design (CAD) equipment, an Oculus Rift virtual reality system, and an audio recording studio. Other makerspace materials include various hand tools, power tools, and crafting equipment and supplies, like yarn and thread. The room serves as the primary meeting space for the Edgar Allan Ohms, the Land O' Lakes High School robotics team sponsored by the library.
Library patrons must consent to the terms of the Pasco County Liability Waiver and Permission Form and the Maker Safety Playbook before they can use The Foundry, but it is otherwise open to all.

Studio H
Studio H is a makerspace located at the Hudson Regional Library that was opened in 2019. It is a multimedia recording studio that provides users with access to equipment, software, and musical instruments. A wide variety of musical instruments are available including electric and acoustic guitars, basses, drum kits, a keyboard, a virtual synthesizer, a banjo, and a mandolin. This makerspace can be used to create music, videos, podcasts, and photos. Users are required to attend an orientation before reserving studio time.

Regency Fresh
Regency Fresh is a makerspace located at the Regency Park Library that had its grand opening on October 17, 2019. It is a fully equipped kitchen with an induction cooktop, double convection oven, an Instant Pot, a sous-vide cooker, microwave, blender, large mixer, and a demonstration cart with an overhead mirror. This kitchen allows users to experience culinary demonstrations and presentations and, in some cases, can participate in these demonstrations. Users can attend a program or submit ideas for future demonstrations and presentations.

The Creation Station
The Creation Station is a kids' mini makerspace located at the Hugh Embry Library. It is a space that was designed with children in grades 2 through 5 in mind. It allows them it to explore, tinker, play, and create projects with many different materials. They are able to plan a project, complete it, put the supplies back, and clean up the area so that it is ready for the next child. There is an Idea Book available to help inspire them and the goal is to finish their project so that they have something to take home with them. There is also a dedicated space called Creation Station, Jr. for younger children.

Community Garden
The Community Garden is a makerspace at the New River Library, which is currently closed for remodeling. The Community Garden works closely with the County Cooperative Extension and the Master Gardeners to be a complete gardening resource.

The Seed Library

Through generous donors, the Pasco County Library Cooperative has created a seed library to share with the community. They have many different types of seeds available, including vegetables, fruits, herbs, and flowers. The seeds are packaged in small bundles and there are growing instructions placed on the outside of the bundles so that patrons can have some information about the plants they have checked out. With these seeds, patrons have the opportunity to grow some of the healthiest food possible. The library asks that patrons only take what they need so that there is plenty of seeds to go around. In order to check out seeds, patrons fill out a request form on the Pasco County Library Cooperative website and then can pick up their bundles at their home branch.

Awards

2014 
 Resolution by the Pasco County Board of Commissioners for the success of the 2014 LAMECon (Library Anime and Manga Enthusiast Convention).
 Done and resolved on August 19, 2014

2013 
 NACo (Florida Association of Counties) Achievement Award for Rockus Maximus Battle of the Bands

2010 
 John Cotton Dana Award for excellence in public relations
The Florida Library Association's Librarian of the Year award was given to Libraries Director Linda Allen. This honor is presented "in recognition of outstanding and ongoing contributions to Florida librarianship."
Florida Library Association's award for best public library website. This prize promotes "awareness of the importance of good design and usability in web page development and to recognize outstanding examples of effective library pages".

2008
 Florida Library of the Year from the Florida Library Association
 "I Love my Librarian!" award given to director Linda Allen by The New York Times Company
 Future of the Region Certificate of Excellence and Commemorative program for Public Education in Catastrophe Readiness and Response: Proactive Roles for Public Libraries awarded by Tampa Bay Regional Planning Council

Pasco Libraries website
The Pasco Libraries website is an integrated website that allows patrons to search the library catalog, check out e-books, search fee-based databases, and access language-learning resources. It also allows patrons to post book reviews, access RSS feeds, create lists, and tag materials. The website has links to the library's social media content, library videos, and e-government sources. It was recognized by the Florida Library Association as the best library website in 2010. Visits to the library's website increased by 28 percent within its first year of being redesigned.

Friends of the Pasco County Library System
Friends of the Pasco County Library System, Inc., is a not-for-profit organization that works closely with the libraries within the cooperative to enrich the library experience of patrons through fundraising, volunteering, and advocacy efforts. The organization acts as a link between the libraries and the citizens of Pasco County. Each branch has its own Friends group that operates independently, however, they also come together to contribute to the success and financial stability of the Countywide Friends Organization. The individual groups work together to ensure that the libraries within this cooperative have the resources they need to better serve the people of Pasco County. The Friends organization provides funding for many of the cultural, art, music, storytime, summer reading, and technology programs that are offered at the libraries.

References

External links
 Pasco County Library System
 Friends of the Library

Public libraries in Florida
Pasco County, Florida